The Sheikh Said rebellion was a Kurdish nationalist rebellion in Turkish Kurdistan in 1925 led by Sheikh Said and with support of the Azadî against the newly-founded Turkish Republic. The rebellion was mostly led by Zaza speakers, but also gained support among some of the neighboring Kurmanji-speaking Kurds in the region. 

The religious and nationalist background of the Sheikh Said Rebellion has been debated by the scholars. The rebellion was described as "the first large-scale nationalist rebellion by the Kurds" by Robert W. Olson.

Background
In Turkey there existed a strong anti-Kurdish policy in the first years of the Turkish Republic. Mustafa Kemal Pasha, in his speech in Eskişehir on 14 January 1923 about the Mosul-Kirkuk area also addressed the Kurdish issue mentioning: ‘'the second issue is the problem of Kurdishness. The British wanted to establish a Kurdish state there (in northern Iraq). If they do, this thought spreads to the Kurds within our borders. To prevent this, we need to cross the border South.'’ In the report the British spokesman sent to London on the 28 November 1919 he stated; "Even though we don't trust the Kurds, it is our interests to use them." The British Prime Minister Lloyd George, on the 19 May 1920 at the San Remo Conference stated that "the Kurds cannot survive without a large state behind them," he says, for the British policy towards the region said: "A new protective admission to all Kurds accustomed to the Turkish administration It will be difficult to bring the British interests to Mosul, where the Kurds live in the mountainous regions and Southern Kurdistan in which they live. It is thought that the region of Mosul could be separated from other parts and connected to a new independent Kurdistan State. However, it would be very difficult to resolve this issue by agreement.

Mosul dispute between the UK and Turkey in Lausanne conference dealt with the bilateral talks, this does not happen it was decided to have recourse to the subject of the League of Nations. On 19 May 1924, the results of the negotiations in Istanbul could not be reached and Britain took the issue on 6 August 1924 to the League of Nations. The Sheikh Said uprising emerged during the days when British occupation forces declared martial law in northern Iraq, removed their officer's permits, and carried their troops to Mosul. In those days, the Colon of Ministers was increasingly under scrutiny, and a powerful British fleet was moving to Basra.

Prior to Sheikh Said's rebellion, the prominent Pashas of the War of Independence worried about the anti-religious and autocratic policy of Atatürk's government and therefore on 17 November 1924, the Terakkiperver Cumhuriyet Fırkası (TCF), the first opposition party in the history of the Republic was established. There was a general consensus that Atatürk's actions were against religion. In the TCF’s article which led by Kazım Karabekir it says that "The political party is respectful to the religious beliefs and thoughts". One of the TCF officials, Fethi Bey, said "The members of the TCF are religious. CHF is messing up with the religion, we will save the religion and protect it".

Two weeks before the Sheikh Said incident, in late January 1925, the TCF Erzurum deputy Ziyaeddin Efendi, with heavy criticism of the actions of the ruling CHF in the chair of the Grand National Assembly, said that ‘innovation’ had led to the encouragement of “isret” (getting drunk), an increase in prostitution, Muslim women losing their decency and, most important of all, religious customs being dishonored and disregarded by the new regime. The Azadî forces under the lead of Halid Beg Cibran were dominated by the former members of the late Ottoman era Hamidiye regiments, a Kurdish tribal militia established during the reign of Sultan Abdul Hamid II to deal with the Armenians, and sometimes even to keep the Qizilbash under control. According to various historians, the main reason the revolt took place was that various elements of the Turkish society were unhappy with the Turkish Parliament's abolition of the Ottoman Caliphate on 3 March 1924. According to British intelligence reports, the Azadî officers had 11 grievances. Apart from Kurdish cultural demands and complaints of Turkish maltreatment, this list also detailed fears of imminent mass deportations of Kurds. They also registered annoyance that the name Kurdistan did not appear on maps, at restrictions on the Kurdish language and on Kurdish education and objections to alleged Turkish economic exploitation of Kurdish areas, at the expense of Kurds. The revolt was proceeded by the smaller and less successful Beytüssebap revolt in September 1924, led by Cibran and Ihsan Nuri on the orders by the prominent Azadî member Ziya Yusuf Bey. The revolt was subdued, and its leaders Cibran and Ziya Yusuf Bey were captured and courtmartialed in Bitlis.

Participation in the rebellion

For the rebellion 
Sheikh Said appealed to all Muslims of Turkey to join in the rebellion being planned. The tribes which actually participated were mostly Zazas. However the Xormak and Herkî, two Zaza-Qizilbash tribes were the most active and effective opponents of this rebellion. experience in confronting the Turkish government. The Azadî, and several officers from the Ottoman empire have supported the rebellion. Robert Olson states that viewing the several sources, a number of 15'000 rebels is about the average of the involved rebels in the revolt.

Against the rebellion 
That some Alevi tribes who participated in the Koçgiri rebellion refused to join the rebellion was a major setback as they had a lot of other tribes also desisted from supporting the rebellion, as their leaders preferred to be in good standing with the Turkish government. Some claim British assistance was sought realizing that Kurdistan could not stand alone. The Kurdish population in around Diyarbakır, farmers as well as Kurdish notables, also desisted. The influential Kurdish Cemilpasazade family even supported the Turkish Government. Also the ruler of Cizre, Sheikh Saida and the powerful Sheikh Ziyaettin from Norşin would not support the rebellion and preferred an arrangement with the Kemalists.

During this rebellion, the Turkish government used its airplanes for bombing raids in Palu-Bingöl area. In the course of this operation, the airfield near Elâzığ was used.

However, according to the British Air Ministry there are few reports on the use of Turkish airplanes in suppressing the Sheikh Said rebellion. The reports originate from the British Air Command at Mosul, which was in charge of intelligence for all of Iraq.

At the beginning of the rebellion the Turks had one squadron (filo) consisting of seven airplanes. Of these only 2 were serviceable. But In the course of the rebellion more than 70 aircraft have been involved in subduing the rebellion.

Turkey also obtained the permission to use the Baghdad Railway to transport their soldiers through Syria from France.

The rebellion
Following the suppression of the Beytüssebap revolt, the Turks attempted to prevent an other rebellion. In February 1925, they moved into the Piran (today called Dicle) area to detain some Kurdish notables, but were prevented by from it by men loyal to Sheikh Said. The intrusion by the Turkish army provoked Kurds around Sheikh Said, and reportedly they have either killed or arrested all the Turkish officers in the areas under their control. On 13 February 1925, Sheikh Said addressed the people in his sermon in the Piran mosque and stated:

The madrasahs were closed. The Ministry of Religion and Foundations was abolished and the schools of religion were connected to the National Education. In the newspapers, a number of irreligious writers dare to insult the Prophet and extend the language of our Prophet. If I can do it today, I will start fighting myself and try to raise religion.

Sheikh Said was elected as the next commander of the Kurdish independence movement gathered around Azadî and Darhini was declared the capital of Kurdistan on the 14 February 1925. Sheikh Said, who had taken the governor and the other officers captive while charging against Darhini (16 February), tried to gather the movement under a single center with a declaration urging the people to rise up in the name of Islam. In this statement, he used his seal which means 'the leader of the fighters for the sake of religion' and called everyone to fight for the sake of religion. Initially, the rebellion was initiated on behalf of the Islamic Sharia, but was later converted to the Kurdish independence movement. The rebellion soon expanded and by 20 February, the town Lice, where the 5th Army corps was headquartered was captured.

After receiving the support of the tribes of Mistan, Botan and Mhallami, he headed to Diyarbakır via Genç and Çapakçur (today known as Bingöl) and captured Maden, Siverek and Ergani. Another uprising, directed by Sheikh Abdullah attempted to capture Muş coming from Varto. But the rebels were defeated around Murat bridge and made them to retreat. On 21 February, the government declared martial law in the eastern provinces. Army troops sent to the insurgents on 23 February were forced to retreat to Diyarbakir in the Winter Plain against the Sheikh Said forces. The next day, another uprising under the leadership of Sheikh Sharif, who entered Elazığ, kept the city under control for a short time. Elazığ was looted by rebels for several days. At the 1 of March, the Kurds managed to assault the Diyarbakır airport and destroy three of the airplanes.

In one of the bigger engagements, in the night of 6–7 March, the forces of Sheikh Said laid siege to the city of Diyarbakır with 5,000–10,000 men. In Diyarbakır the headquarters of the Seventh Army Corps was located. But neither the Kurdish notables nor the Kurdish farmers in the region in and around Diyarbakır refused to support the rebellion. The Muslim Revivalists attacked the city at all four gates simultaneously. All of their attacks were repelled by the numerically inferior Turkish garrison, with the use of machine gun fire and mortar grenades. When the rebels retreated the next morning, the area around the city was full of dead bodies. When a second wave of attacks failed, the siege was finally lifted on 11 March. After a large consignment, a mass attack (26 March), and with a suppress operation the Turkish troops made many of the enemy troops to surrender and squeezed the insurgency leaders while they were preparing to move to the Iran in Boğlan (today known as Sohlan). Sheikh Sharif and some of the tribal leaders were captured in Palu, and Sheikh Said too in Varto was seized at Carpuh Bridge with a close relative's notice (15 April 1925).

By the end of March, most of the major battles of the Sheikh Said rebellion were over. The Turkish authorities, according to Martin van Bruinessen, crushed the rebellion with continual aerial bombardments and a massive concentration of forces. The rebels were unable to penetrate beyond Hınıs, this was one of the two major areas where Sheikh Said was well known and he enjoyed considerable influence there (he had a tekke in Hınıs). This failure excluded the possibility of extending the rebellion.

On the other hand, Hasan Hayri Efendi, who was Dersim Deputy and Alevi Zaza, entered into solidarity with Sheikh Sharif, appointed by Sheikh Said as Commander of the Elaziz Front. A joint letter with Sheikh Sharif in Elaziz was sent to all the tribal leaders of Dersim on 6 March 1925.

Political measures by the Turkish Government

Mustafa Kemal Atatürk foresaw the seriousness of the rebellion and urged İsmet İnönü to come to Ankara, as he had been resting for a vacation at an island near Istanbul. Atatürk welcomed İnönü and his family at the Ankara Station to explain him how serious the situation has become. Mustafa Kemal, Ali Fethi (Okyar) and İsmet İnönü had a meeting on the 24 February 1925, which lasted for 7 1/2 hours and the main subject was the rebellion. Following, the Government of Ali Fethi has issued a circular which vowed strict measures against the rebels on the 25 February 1925 and announced the reign of martial law in the eastern provinces and classified the use of religious aims against the government as treason. The Turkish Parliament was not pleased with this action and in response, the Turkish prime minister Ali Fethi was criticized by the politicians of the Republican People's Party. However, Mustafa Kemal Pasha, advocated for the resignation of Prime Minister Ali Fethi against the rapid rise of the incidents and appointed İsmet Pasha to establish a new government on 2 March. Ali Fethi resigned on the 3 March and was replaced by Ismet Inönü. The ban on the uprising has been extended to include other measures. In addition, it was decided to re-establish the Independence Courts in Ankara and Diyarbakır.

Financial cost 
The sum of 7 Mio. Turkish Pounds was reported by the US military attaché in Turkey. Hamit Bozarslan estmiates that about 35% of the budget went into the suppression of the revolt.

Aftermath
Seyit Abdülkadir, the leader of the Kurdish Teali Society and several of his friends who were accused of supporting the rebellion, were arrested in Istanbul and taken to Diyarbakır to be tried. As a result of the trial, Seyit Abdulkadir and five of his friends were sentenced to death by the Independence Tribunal in Diyarbakır on 23 May 1925 and executed four days later. A journalist for a Kurdish newspaper in Bitlis, the poet Hizanizâde Kemal Fevzi, was also among the executed.

The Independence Tribunal in Diyarbakir also imposed a death sentence on Sheikh Said and 47 riots rulers on the 28 June 1925. Penalties were carried out the next day, by Sheikh Said coming up first. The President of the Independence Tribunal in Diyarbakır that sentenced the rebels stated on 28 June 1925:

In total over 7000 people were prosecuted by the Independence tribunals and more than 600 people were executed. The suppression of the Shaykh Said Uprising was an important milestone in the control of the Republican administration in Eastern Anatolia and South East Anatolia. On the other hand, the developments that emerged with the uprising led to the interruption of the steps towards transition to multi-party life for a long while. Also against the Progressive Republican Party was opened an investigation on the grounds that it was involved in the riot and was soon closed under a government decree.

After the uprising, the Turkish state prepared a Report for Reform in the East (Şark Islahat Raporu) in 1925, which suggested that the Kurds shall be Turkified. Thousands of Kurds fled their homes in southeastern Turkey and crossed the border to Syria, where they settled and were granted citizenship by the French mandate authorities.

In the Fall of 1927, Sheikh Abdurrahman, the brother of Sheikh Said, began a series of revenge attacks on Turkish garrisons in Palu and Malatya. In August 1928 Sheikh Abdurrahman and another brother of Sheikh Said, Sheikh Mehdi, turned themselves in and made use of the amnesty law issued by the Turkish Government in May of the same year.

Reception 
In the Turkish press the suppression of the revolt was praised and according to Günther Deschner for quite some time also the western historians seemed to see the suppression as a pacification of a rebellious region. In Turkey it was assumed that the Sheikh Said revolt was supported by the British Empire who wanted to achieve certain concessions with reagards to the Mosul dispute between Turkey and the British. The British on the other side assumed the Kemalists could have engineered the revolt, assuming that if the Kurdish revolt in Turkey was temporarily to succeed it would lead to a prolonged conflict over the Mosul Vilayet in Iraq with Turkey eventually able to occupy it.  One of the early observers who criticized the way the Turkish Government treated the Kurdish people was the Indian Jawaharlal Nehru, who deemed the Kurds to have wanted to achieve something similar the Turks had achieved for themselves and questioned how a struggle for freedom could turn into an oppressive regime.

References

Sources

 

1925 in Turkey
Conflicts in 1925
20th-century rebellions
Kurdish–Turkish conflict
 
History of Bingöl Province
History of Diyarbakır Province
History of Elazığ Province
Rebellions in Turkey